Parachilna may refer to:

Parachilna, South Australia, a town and locality
Hundred of Parachilna, a cadastral unit in South Australia
Parachilna (album), an audio recording
Parachilna Fettlers' Cottages Ruins, a heritage-listed site - refer Parachilna, South Australia
Parachilna Gorge, a gorge in South Australia which can be accessed via the Heysen Trail